Hill's roundleaf bat (Hipposideros edwardshilli) is a species of bat in the family Hipposideridae endemic to Papua New Guinea.

Taxonomy
Hill's roundleaf bat was described as a new species in 1993 by Tim Flannery and Donald Colgan. The holotype had been collected in the Bewani Mountains near Imonda Station in 1990 by P. German and L. Seri. The eponym for the species name "edwardshilli" was British mammalogist John Edwards Hill, "in recognition of his outstanding contributions to bat taxonomy".

Description
It differs from all other Hipposideros species in its two club-like projections on its nose-leaf.

Range and habitat
Hill's roundleaf bat is endemic to Papua New Guinea in Oceania.

Conservation
As of 2017, it is evaluated as a vulnerable species by the IUCN. It meets the criteria for this designation because it has a potentially limited habitat for roosting. Habitat loss is ongoing through deforestation. It has not been documented since its description in 1993.

References

Hipposideros
Bats of Oceania
Endemic fauna of Papua New Guinea
Mammals of Papua New Guinea
Mammals described in 1993
Taxonomy articles created by Polbot
Taxa named by Tim Flannery
Bats of New Guinea